Graeme Brown is a British newspaper journalist and the current editor of the Birmingham Mail, editor-in-chief of the Birmingham Post, the Sunday Mercury, and their sister website BirminghamLive.

Background 
Brown graduated from Coventry University.

Career 
Brown began his journalism career in 2004 as a business reporter for the Stoke-on-Trent daily The Sentinel where, in 2008, he became deputy business editor.

In 2009, he became deputy regional head of business at Birmingham Post & Mail (BPM) titles Birmingham Post, Birmingham Mail and Sunday Mercury.

In 2013, he became head of business at these titles and in 2015, he became editor of agenda and business. In 2016, he became executive editor in the same capacity. During this period, Brown facilitated the launch of Black Country Live.

In November 2019, he was unveiled by Reach plc as editor of the Coventry Telegraph and its Coventry Live sister website.

In October 2020, Brown was appointed by Reach plc as the company's Senior Editor in Birmingham, the Black Country and Worcestershire.

As a regional news editor, Brown also makes regular television appearances to discuss current affairs.

References

Living people

Year of birth missing (living people)
21st-century British journalists
British newspaper editors
Alumni of Coventry University
English newspaper editors
British newspaper journalists
People from Birmingham, West Midlands